The 2010 Yellow Sea conflict may refer to the following incidents:

Korean Peninsula
ROKS Cheonan sinking
Shelling of Yeonpyeong

China/Japan
Dandong shooting incident
Senkaku Islands dispute#2010
2010 Senkaku boat collision incident

United States
USS George Washington (CVN-73)#2010

See also

Korean War
Battle of Daecheong
2009 North Korean nuclear test

References

Yellow Sea Conflict, 2010
Conflicts in 2010
Maritime incidents in 2010